The Maritime Museum Rotterdam is a maritime museum in Rotterdam, The Netherlands. Dedicated to naval history, it was founded in 1874 by Prince Henry of the Netherlands.

Next to the Maritime Museum lies the open-air Maritime Museum Harbour, which merged with the Maritime Museum in 2014. The Maritime Museum Harbour contains an exceptional collection of historic vessels and cranes which are maintained in working condition.

Collection 
The Museum Collection contains 850.000 objects from six centuries of maritime history.

Exhibitions 
In the Maritime Museum you can visit a diverse range of permanent and changing exhibitions for three generations: children between 4 and 12, their parents and grandparents. The exhibitions show the maritime influence on our everyday life. Today the museum is working on an offshore exhibition which will be open at the end of 2016.

Masterpieces (Topstukken) 

'Masterpieces’ by the Maritime Museum is showcasing twenty-five unique objects from its centuries-old collection. Each object has earned its place in the exhibition in its own way – because of its revolutionary role in shipping, because it is a silent witness to a key moment in maritime history, or because it is such a high-quality piece. The most important piece is the Mataró model, which means much the same to the Maritime Museum as Rembrandt’s Nightwatch does to the Rijksmuseum. It is the oldest model ship in Europe, dating back more than six centuries. And it has been made extremely accurately.

The other masterpieces in the exhibition are all of nearly the same calibre. The Itinerario by Jan Huygen van Linschoten is one of the most important travel journals in the world, revealing all the secrets of the Portuguese - the WikiLeaks of the sixteenth century. Furthermore, it includes the pen-and-ink drawings of Willem van de Velde and sea charts of the Corpus Christi collection by the master cartographer Joan Blaeu. This is a collection of East India Company charts that lay hidden in England for three hundred years and came to the Maritime Museum in 2006 after being purchased for millions.

Maritime Museum Harbour 

A former attraction was the 19th-century ironclad ram ship HNLMS Buffel, which was moored outside of the museum. The ship was moved to Hellevoetsluis in 2013 (due to cost cuts) where it will be exploited by the Stichting Museumschip de Buffel to preserve this ship for the generations to come.

The Maritime Museum Harbour includes the red cast iron Low Light of the Hook of Holland, which formerly stood at the entrance to the Nieuwe Waterweg (New Waterway). Furthermore, it includes a wide range of steam tugs, a steam driven sheerleg and a working grain elevator. A diverse range of historical inland vessels is also exposed here. Visitors are able to enter most of the ships. In the summer the Museum organizes cruises through the city of Rotterdam with these ships.

Professor Splash (Professor Plons) 
In this exhibition children between 4 and 12 years old learn about the maritime world by playing. As they play, they learn all sorts of things about various types of ships, working in the port, navigation and how products such as their own toys are transported by ship from all over the world to the Netherlands.

References

External links
 Maritime Museum Rotterdam
 Stichting Museumschip de Buffel

Maritime museums in the Netherlands
Museums in Rotterdam
Museums established in 1874
Buildings and structures in Rotterdam
Port of Rotterdam